Mohamed Belouizdad (3 November 1924, in Algiers – 14 January 1952, in Paris), was an Algerian militant and chief "responsible" (manager) of Special Organisation (OS), the military branch of the Algerian People's Party, (in French, Parti du Peuple Algerien) (PPA).

Originating from Guenzet, a town and commune in Sétif Province in north-eastern Algeria, he was born  in Belcourt, a quarter of Algiers to a family of five brothers and two sisters. Among his siblings was Dr. Mustapha Belouizdad, and Othmane Belouizdad, a member of CRUA and Sahnoun Belouizdad, a militant who died in prison of El Harrach succumbing to torture. 

After his studies, in 1944 he worked as a militant of the "Jeune de Belcourt" (CJB) and in the Comité central jeune du Grand Alger (CCJGA), the youth organisation of the Algerian People's Party (PPA) that saw massive arrests after the great demonstrations of 8 May 1945. In 1947, he was one of the founders of the Special Organisation in opposition to the French occupation of Algeria. Suffering from tuberculosis for many years, he died on 14 January 1952 while in France. His body was returned to Algeria and was buried in Belcourt, in Algiers.

The Algerian government changed the name of the quarter to Mohamed Belouizdad in his honour.

See also
 Declaration of 1 November 1954

Sources
Yves Courrière, La guerre d'Algérie, Fayard, 2001 

People of the Algerian War
Algerian politicians
1924 births
1952 deaths
20th-century deaths from tuberculosis
Algerian emigrants to France
Tuberculosis deaths in France